Achondroplasia is a genetic disorder with an autosomal dominant pattern of inheritance whose primary feature is dwarfism. In those with the condition, the arms and legs are short, while the torso is typically of normal length. Other features can include an enlarged head and prominent forehead. Complications can include sleep apnea or recurrent ear infections. Achondroplasia includes short-limb skeletal dysplasia with severe combined immunodeficiency.

Achondroplasia is caused by a mutation in the fibroblast growth factor receptor 3 (FGFR3) gene that results in its protein being overactive. Achondroplasia results in impaired endochondral bone growth (bone growth within cartilage). The disorder has an autosomal dominant mode of inheritance, meaning only one mutated copy of the gene is required for the condition to occur. About 80% of cases occur in children of parents of average stature and result from a new mutation, which most commonly originates as a spontaneous change during spermatogenesis. The rest are inherited from a parent with the condition. The risk of a new mutation increases with the age of the father. In families with two affected parents, children who inherit both affected genes typically die before birth or in early infancy from breathing difficulties. The condition is generally diagnosed based on the clinical features but may be confirmed by genetic testing.

Treatments may include support groups and growth hormone therapy. Efforts to treat or prevent complications such as obesity, hydrocephalus, obstructive sleep apnea, middle ear infections or spinal stenosis may be required. Achondroplasia is the most common cause of dwarfism and affects about 1 in 27,500 people.

Signs and symptoms 
 Disproportionate dwarfism 
 Shortening of the proximal limbs (called rhizomelic shortening)
 Short fingers and toes, with "trident hands" (short hands with stubby fingers, and a separation between the middle and ring fingers – reminiscent of a trident on fetal ultrasound )
 Large head with prominent forehead frontal bossing
 Small midface with a flattened nasal bridge
 Spinal kyphosis (convex curvature) or lordosis (concave curvature)
 Varus (bowleg) or valgus (knock knee) deformities
 Frequent ear infections (due to Eustachian tube blockages), sleep apnea (which can be central or obstructive), and hydrocephalus

Complications

Children 

Children with achondroplasia often have less muscle tone; because of this it is common for them to have delayed walking and motor skills. It is also common for children to have bowed legs, scoliosis, lordosis, arthritis, issues with joint flexibility, breathing problems, ear infections, and crowded teeth. These issues can be treated with surgery, braces, or physical therapy.

Hydrocephalus is a severe effect associated with achondroplasia in children. This condition occurs when cerebrospinal fluid is not able to flow in and out of the skull because of how the spine narrows. This fluid build up is associated with an enlarged head, vomiting, lethargy, headaches, and irritability. A shunt surgery is commonly performed to treat this condition, but an endoscopic third ventriculostomy can also be done.

Adults 
Adults with achondroplasia often face issues with obesity and sleep apnea. It is also typical for adults to experience numbness or tingling in their legs because of nerve compression. 

Some research has found that adults with achondroplasia may also experience psychosocial complications, usually associated with short stature.

Pregnancy in women with achondroplasia is considered higher risk. Women with achondroplasia generally have their babies delivered through C-sections to prevent complications that could occur with a natural birth. The life expectancy of people with achondroplasia is approximately 10 years less than average.

Causes 

Achondroplasia is caused by a mutation in fibroblast growth factor receptor 3 (FGFR3) gene. This gene encodes a protein called fibroblast growth factor receptor 3, which contributes to the production of collagen and other structural components in tissues and bones. When the FGFR3 gene is mutated it interferes with how this protein interacts with growth factors leading to complications with bone production. Cartilage is not able to fully develop into bone, causing the individual to be disproportionately shorter in height.

In normal development, FGFR3 has a negative regulatory effect on bone growth. In achondroplasia, the mutated form of the receptor is constitutively active and this leads to severely shortened bones. This is an example of a gain of function mutation. The effect is genetically dominant, with one variant of the FGFR3 gene being sufficient to cause achondroplasia, while two copies of the mutant gene are invariably fatal (recessive lethal) before or shortly after birth. This occurs due to respiratory failure from an underdeveloped ribcage. People with achondroplasia are often born to parents that do not have the condition due to spontaneous mutation.

Where achondroplasia is inherited, its pattern is autosomal dominant. In couples where one partner has achondroplasia there is a 50% chance of passing the disorder on to their child every pregnancy. In situations where both parents have achondroplasia there is a 50% chance the child will have achondroplasia, 25% chance the child will not, and a 25% chance that the child will inherit the gene from both parents resulting in double dominance and leading to lethal bone dysplasia.

Studies have demonstrated that new gene mutations for achondroplasia are exclusively inherited from the father and occur during spermatogenesis; it has been theorized that sperm carrying the mutation in FGFR3 have a selective advantage over sperm with normal FGFR3. The frequency of mutations in sperm leading to achondroplasia increases in proportion to paternal age, as well as in proportion to exposure to ionizing radiation. The occurrence rate of achondroplasia in the children of fathers over 50 years of age is 1 in 1,875, compared to 1 in 15,000 in the general population. Research by urologist Harry Fisch of the Male Reproductive Center at Columbia Presbyterian Hospital in 2013 indicated that in humans this defect may be exclusively inherited from the father and becomes increasingly probable with paternal age, specifically males reproducing after 35.

There are two other syndromes with a genetic basis similar to achondroplasia: hypochondroplasia and thanatophoric dysplasia.

Diagnosis 

Achondroplasia can be detected before birth by prenatal ultrasound, although signs are often subtle and not apparent before the 24th week of pregnancy. A DNA test can be performed before birth to detect homozygosity, wherein two copies of the mutant gene are inherited, a lethal condition leading to stillbirths. Postnatal diagnosis of achondroplasia is typically uncomplicated, involving an assessment of physical and radiographic features.  Clinical features include megalocephaly, short limbs, prominent forehead, thoracolumbar kyphosis and mid-face hypoplasia. Complications like dental malocclusion, hydrocephalus and repeated otitis media can be observed. The risk of death in infancy is increased due to the likelihood of compression of the spinal cord with or without upper airway obstruction.

Radiologic findings 
A skeletal survey is useful to confirm the diagnosis of achondroplasia. The skull is large, with a narrow foramen magnum, and relatively small skull base. The vertebral bodies are short and flattened with relatively large intervertebral disk height, and there is congenitally narrowed spinal canal. The iliac wings are small and squared, with a narrow sciatic notch and horizontal acetabular roof. The tubular bones are short and thick with metaphyseal cupping and flaring and irregular growth plates. Fibular overgrowth is present. The hand is broad with short metacarpals and phalanges, and a trident configuration. The ribs are short with cupped anterior ends. If the radiographic features are not classic, a search for a different diagnosis should be entertained. Because of the extremely deformed bone structure, people with achondroplasia are often "double jointed". The diagnosis can be made by fetal ultrasound by progressive discordance between the short femur length and biparietal diameter by age. The trident hand configuration can be seen if the fingers are fully extended.

Another common characteristic of the syndrome is thoracolumbar gibbus in infancy.

Treatment 
There is no known cure for achondroplasia even though the cause of the mutation in the growth factor receptor has been found. Although used by those without achondroplasia to aid in growth, human growth hormone does not help people with achondroplasia, which involve a different hormonal pathway. Usually, the best results appear within the first and second year of therapy. After the second year of growth hormone therapy, beneficial bone growth decreases, so the therapy is not a satisfactory long-term treatment. As of December 2020, the treatment of achondroplasia with human growth hormone was approved only in Japan.

An experimental drug called vosoritide has shown promise in stage 3 human trials, although its long-term effects are unknown.

Limb-lengthening will increase the length of the legs and arms of someone with achondroplasia,  but little medical consensus exists regarding this practice. The age of surgery can vary from early childhood to adulthood.

Research has also shown that introducing parents of children with achondroplasia to support and advocacy groups at the time of diagnosis can improve outcomes. Several patient advocacy groups exist to support people with achondroplasia and their families.

Epidemiology 
Achondroplasia is one of several congenital conditions with similar presentations, such as osteogenesis imperfecta, multiple epiphyseal dysplasia tarda, achondrogenesis, osteopetrosis, and thanatophoric dysplasia. This makes estimates of prevalence difficult, with changing and subjective diagnostic criteria over time. One detailed and long-running study in the Netherlands found that the prevalence determined at birth was only 1.3 per 100,000 live births. Another study at the same time found a rate of 1 per 10,000. A 2020 review and meta-analysis estimated a worldwide prevalence of 4.6 per 100,000.

Research 
, tentative evidence has found that the experimental peptide drug vosoritide increases growth velocity in those with achondroplasia. The drug inhibits the activity of FGFR3.

Animals 
Based on their disproportionate dwarfism, some dog breeds traditionally have been classified as "achondroplastic". This is the case for the dachshund, basset hound, corgi and bulldog breeds. Data from whole genome association studies in short-limbed dogs reveal a strong association of this trait with a retro-gene coding for fibroblast growth factor 4 (FGF4). Therefore, it seems unlikely that dogs and humans are achondroplastic for the same reasons. However, histological studies in some achondroplastic dog breeds have shown altered cell patterns in cartilage that are very similar to those observed in humans exhibiting achondroplasia.

A similar form of achondroplasia was found in a litter of piglets from a phenotypically normal Danish sow. The dwarfism was inherited dominant in the offspring from this litter. The piglets were born phenotypically normal, but became more and more symptomatic as they reached maturity. This involved a mutation of the protein collagen, type X, alpha 1, encoded by the COL10A1 gene.  In humans a similar mutation (G595E) has been associated with Schmid metaphyseal chondrodysplasia (SMCD), a relatively mild skeletal disorder that is also associated with dwarfism.

The now-extinct Ancon sheep was created by humans through the selective breeding of common domestic sheep with achondroplasia. The average-sized torso combined with the relatively smaller legs produced by achondroplasia was valued for making affected sheep less likely to escape without affecting the amount of wool or meat each sheep produced.

See also 
 Achondroplasia in children
 List of radiographic findings associated with cutaneous conditions
 Dwarfism

References

External links 

 
 

Cell surface receptor deficiencies
Connective tissue diseases
Growth disorders
Rare diseases
Dwarfism
Wikipedia medicine articles ready to translate